Season three of Dancing With the Stars  premiered on September 12, 2006, on the ABC network.

For this season, the scoring system was changed. Fan vote only counted for 25% of the total score and scoring was now translated directly from percentages rather than into ordinals. The judges scores were added up, and each performer was given points based on the percentage of the total points distributed among all performers. (For example, a team received a score of 25. A total of 207 points were awarded to all nine performers. The team received 12.08% of that total, so that team earned 12.08 points. The couple happens to be Sara & Tony.) The fan vote was handled the same way, with the points based on how much of the total fan vote the star received. (So, in the same example, if the team earned 15% of the total fan vote, their grand total is 27.08 points.)

On November 15, Dallas Cowboys running back Emmitt Smith and Cheryl Burke were crowned the champions, while actor Mario Lopez and Karina Smirnoff finished in second place, and actor Joey Lawrence and Edyta Śliwińska finished in third.

Cast

Couples
The number of couples competing expanded to eleven from the ten in the previous season.

On October 12, 2006, Sara Evans announced her withdrawal from the competition to be with her children after filing for divorce from her husband. In a "final appearance", a pre-taped interview with Evans about her decision was shown on the October 17 episode. Willa Ford stated on Headline News' Robin & Company that ABC had invited her to return to the competition, but she declined. At the end of the October 18 results show, it was revealed that there would be no elimination for the week due to Evans' departure. The scores from week 6 were combined with the scores from week 7 for the October 25 elimination. Evans returned for the season finale.

Future appearances
Emmitt Smith returned for the All-Stars season, where he was again paired with Cheryl Burke.

Hosts and judges
Tom Bergeron and Samantha Harris returned as co-hosts, while Carrie Ann Inaba, Len Goodman, and Bruno Tonioli returned as judges.

Scoring charts

Notes

 : This was the lowest score of the week.
 : This was the highest score of the week.
 :  This couple finished in first place.
 :  This couple finished in second place.
 :  This couple withdrew from the competition.
 :  This couple was in the bottom two or three, but was not eliminated.
 :  This couple was eliminated.

Highest and lowest scoring performances 
The highest and lowest performances in each dance according to the judges' 30-point scale are as follows.

Couples' highest and lowest scoring dances
Scores are based upon a potential 30-point maximum.

Weekly scores
Individual judges' scores in the charts below (given in parentheses) are listed in this order from left to right: Carrie Ann Inaba, Len Goodman, Bruno Tonioli.

Week 1
Each couple performed either the cha-cha-cha or the foxtrot. Couples are listed in the order they performed.

Week 2
Each couple performed either the mambo or the quickstep. Couples are listed in the order they performed.

Week 3
Each couple performed either the jive or the tango. Couples are listed in the order they performed.

Week 4
Each couple performed either the paso doble or the waltz. Couples are listed in the order they performed.

Week 5
Each couple performed either the rumba or the samba. Couples are listed in the order they performed.

Week 6
Each couple performed one unlearned dance, plus a group disco dance. Due to Sara Evans' withdraw from the competition, there was no elimination at the end of the night. Couples are listed in the order they performed.

Week 7
Each couple performed two unlearned dances. Couples are listed in the order they performed.

Week 8: Halloween Week
Each couple performed two dances. Couples are listed in the order they performed.

Week 9
Each couple performed two dances. Couples are listed in the order they performed.

Week 10
Each couple performed three dances: the samba, their favorite dance of the season, and a freestyle. Couples are listed in the order they performed.

Dance chart
The celebrities and professional partners danced one of these routines for each corresponding week:
 Week 1: One unlearned dance (cha-cha-cha or foxtrot)
 Week 2: One unlearned dance (mambo or quickstep)
 Week 3: One unlearned dance (jive or tango)
 Week 4: One unlearned dance (paso doble or waltz)
 Week 5: One unlearned dance (rumba or samba)
 Week 6: One unlearned dance & disco group dance
 Week 7: Two unlearned dances
 Week 8: Two unlearned dances
 Week 9: One unlearned dance & redemption dance
 Week 10 (Night 1): Samba & freestyle
 Week 10 (Night 2): Favorite dance of the season

Notes

 :  This was the highest scoring dance of the week.
 :  This was the lowest scoring dance of the week.
 :  This couple danced, but received no scores.

References

External links

Dancing with the Stars (American TV series)
2006 American television seasons